Micythus anopsis is a species of ground spider found in Thailand. It is the most recent species of Micythus to be discovered.

References 

Gnaphosidae
Spiders of Asia